Antonio Vicino (born 24 January 1995) is an Italian rower. He won the 2022 world championship title in the Italian men's lightweight quad scull after earlier winning gold that season at the 2022 European Rowing Championships.

References

External links

1995 births
Living people
Italian male rowers
Rowers of Marina Militare
21st-century Italian people
20th-century Italian people
World Rowing Championships medalists for Italy